The IBM Public License (IPL) is a free open-source software license written and occasionally used by IBM. It is approved by the Free Software Foundation (FSF) and described as an "open-source license" by the Open Source Initiative.

The IPL differs from the GNU General Public License (GPL), in that it places the liability on the publisher or distributor of the licensed software code. The reason behind this is to facilitate the commercial use of open-source software, without placing the contributor at risk of liability.  Proponents of the IPL note a clearer definition of responsibility for software code than that of the GPL.

The IPL is incompatible with the GPL because it contains restrictions not included in the GPL, specifically a choice of law clause stating the license is to be interpreted under the laws of the State of New York and United States intellectual property law. According to the FSF, "This is a free software license. Unfortunately, it has a choice of law clause which makes it incompatible with the GNU GPL."

The IPL differs from the GPL in the handling of patents, as IPL terminates the license upon patent disputes.

Examples of software projects licensed under the IPL include Postfix, OpenAFS, and the now-unmaintained Jikes compiler for Java.

See also 

IBM Common Public License
GNU General Public License
Mozilla Public License
Software license

References

External links
IBM Public License Version 1.0.
The mailing list debian-legal's covering of the license.
FSF license list with categorisation and comments on the IBM Public License

Free and open-source software licenses
Copyleft software licenses
Public License